Örkelljunga VK is a volleyball club in Örkelljunga, Sweden, established in August 1982. The club won the Swedish men's national championship in 1999 2002, 2003 and 2004.

References

External links
Official website 

1982 establishments in Sweden
Sport in Skåne County
Volleyball clubs established in 1982
Swedish volleyball clubs